This is a timeline of women's suffrage in Iowa. Women's suffrage work started early in Iowa's history. Organizing began in the late 1960s with the first state suffrage convention taking place in 1870. In the 1890s, women gained the right to vote on municipal bonds, tax efforts and school-related issues. By 1916, a state suffrage amendment went to out to a voter referendum, which unfortunately failed. Iowa was the tenth state to ratify the Nineteenth Amendment in 1919.

19th century

1840s 
1843

 Iowa State Legislature discusses women's suffrage alongside other issues relating to women.

1844

 During the state constitutional convention, there were discussions about both African American and women's suffrage.

1850s 
1854

 Frances Dana Gage speaks about women's rights and voting in Oskaloosa.
1855

 Amelia Bloomer is the first resident of Iowa to discuss women's suffrage in the state.

1857

 The Iowa state constitution only allows only white men to vote. Women's suffrage is also discussed during these sessions.

1860s 
1866

 Suffragists in Clinton County present a petition to the state house to support a state constitutional amendment for women's suffrage.
The suffrage bill does not pass out of the Iowa state senate.

1868

 November 3: The word "white" to describe a voter is removed from the state constitution after a successful voter referendum passes.
1869

 Mary Newbury Adams organizes the Northern Iowa Woman Suffrage Association (NIWSA).

1870s 
1870

 March: The first state constitutional amendment bill for women's suffrage passes and must pass again in 1872.
June 16-17: The first state suffrage convention is held in Mount Pleasant. The Iowa Equal Suffrage Association (IESA) is created.
October 25: The Polk County Suffrage Society is organized.
1871

 Clarinda voter registry board adds the names of women to the list of voters, but most are removed later.
 Keziah Anderson Dorrance casts her vote in Taylor County and friendly judges uphold it as a valid vote. Dorrance became the first woman to vote in Iowa.
October: The state suffrage convention is held in Des Moines.

1872

 The suffrage bill does not pass a second time.
1873

 March: State suffrage convention is held.

1874

 Iowa state Republicans promise to work towards a women's suffrage amendment.

1876

 The Iowa Governor and the state House both support a suffrage amendment.

1877

 The Iowa chapter of the Woman's Christian Temperance Union (WCTU) comes out in support of women's suffrage during their convention in Ottumwa.

1880s 
1884

 A women's suffrage bill passes in the state Senate, but not the state House.
November 27–28: The state suffrage convention was held in Des Moines.
1885

 October 21–22: The state suffrage convention is held in Cedar Rapids.
1886

 A municipal suffrage bill is proposed but doesn't come up for a full vote.
The state suffrage convention takes place in Otumwa.
 September: The Woman's Standard is founded and Mary J. Coggeshall and Martha C. Callanan serve as editors.

1887

 State suffrage convention is held in Des Moines.

1888

 State suffrage convention is held in Ames and Susan B. Anthony speaks.
Anti-suffragists stage an anti-suffrage parade in Davenport.

1889

 October 30-November 1: The state suffrage convention is held in Oskaloosa. Henry Browne Blackwell and Lucy Stone attended. 
November: Carrie Chapman Catt starts the Political Equality Club of Sioux City.

1890s 
1890

 Governor William Larrabee advocates for partial women's suffrage at the state General Assembly.
December 4–5: The state suffrage convention is held in Des Moines.

1891

 November 7: The Iowa Equal Suffrage Association (IESA) is incorporated.
 December 3–4: The state suffrage convention is held in Ames.

1892

 A bill to allow women to vote for presidential electors is proposed but doesn't make it out of Committee.
September 22: The state suffrage convention is held in Des Moines.
1893

 November 9–10: The state suffrage convention is held in Webster City.

1894

 February: Two partial suffrage bills are introduced in the Iowa State House and Senate.
March 22: The partial suffrage bill that combined municipal and school suffrage issues, called the Watkins Bill, is passed by that state House.
April 13: Women who pay taxes gain partial suffrage and can vote on bond issues and for school issues.
November 8–9: The state suffrage convention is held in Marshalltown.
Women in Waterloo came together to vote and support the library tax for the city.

1895

 October 18–19: State suffrage convention is held in Des Moines.

1896

 Pauline Swalm speaks about the Woman Citizen at the Iowa State Fair.
November 17–19: The state suffrage convention is held in Independence.
1897

 January: The National American Woman Suffrage Association (NAWSA) holds their annual convention in Des Moines.
April 2–3: Anna Howard Shaw speaks in Jefferson on women's suffrage.
1898

 February 23: The Iowa Association Opposed to Woman Suffrage (IAOWS) is organized.

20th century

1900s 
1900

 Petitions with more than 100,000 signatures for women's suffrage were sent to the state legislature.
May: The Iowa Federation of Colored Women's Clubs (IFCWC) is organized and Helen Downey is the first president.
1901

 November: The state suffrage annual convention in Waterloo.

1902

 Women's suffrage legislation passes in the state Senate and fails in the House.
October: The state suffrage convention is held in Des Moines.

1903

 October: Boone hosts the state suffrage convention.

1904

 October: The state suffrage convention is held in Sheldon.

1905

 November: The state suffrage convention is held in Panora.
1906

 September: The annual state suffrage convention is held in Ida Grove.

1907

 October: The state suffrage convention is held in Des Moines.

1908

 October: The state suffrage convention is held in Boone.
October 29: A suffrage parade in Boone is organized by Rowena Edson Stevenson and Eleanor Gordon. Around 150 women marched and then heard a speech by Anna Howard Shaw.
 November: Women voters are not given ballots during the bond election in Des Moines.

1910s 
1910

 Around 79 men found the Iowa chapter of the Men's League for Woman Suffrage.

1911

 The Iowa Woman's Christian Temperance Union (WCTU) has publicly declared their support for women's suffrage.
The Iowa Federation of Women's Clubs (IFWC) declares their support for suffrage during their convention in Sioux City.
The Woman's Standard ceases publication.
December 22: Mary Jane Coggeshall died and left $5,000 to the state suffrage groups and $10,000 to the national effort.

1912

 The Progressive, Prohibition, Republican, and Socialist parties in Iowa officially endorsed women's suffrage.
During the Iowa State Fair, the City Council of Suffrage Clubs sponsored a showing of Votes for Women.
July: An automobile tour is organized by suffragists who travel between Des Moines and Mitchellville, giving speeches.
October: The state suffrage convention was held in Des Moines.

1913

 March 15: An equal suffrage bill is passed and signed by Governor George W. Clarke. The bill has to pass in the next legislative session in 1915 before it can go out to voters.
September: Another automobile tour is organized by suffragists and travels through 30 towns.
October: State suffrage convention is held in Boone.
1914

 March 29-31: Mississippi Valley Suffrage Conference is held in Des Moines.
 October: The state suffrage meeting is held in Des Moines.

1915

 October: State suffrage convention is held in Des Moines.

1916

 June 3: African American's march for women's suffrage in Buxton.
 June 5: The suffrage amendment is defeated.
1917

 State suffrage convention is held in Des Moines.

1918

 June: Suffrage school for educating women on the upcoming federal suffrage amendment is held at William Penn College in Oskaloosa.
 September: State suffrage convention meets in Cedar Rapids.

1919

 January: Governor William L. Harding recommends support for the federal suffrage amendment in the state legislature.
April: Women's presidential suffrage bill passes.
July 2: Iowa is the 10th state to ratify the Nineteenth Amendment.
August: Sue M. Wilson Brown founds and leads the Des Moines League of Colored Women Voters.
October 2: The IESA dissolves and becomes the Iowa League of Women Voters (LWV).

References

Sources 

 

Iowa suffrage
Timelines of states of the United States
Suffrage referendums